Ingenuity may refer to:
Ingenuity (helicopter), part of NASA's Mars 2020 mission
Ingenuity (Crespi), a painting
Ingenuity (album), a 1994 Ultravox album
QIAGEN Silicon Valley, formerly Ingenuity Systems, a biotechnology software company
THG Ingenuity, an e-commerce service of THG plc

See also 
 Creativity
 Ingenious (disambiguation)